is a Japanese track and field athlete who competes in the 400 metres hurdles. He is the reigning Asian champion in the event.

Born in Okayama Prefecture, Abe initially contested both the 110 metres hurdles and the 400 m hurdles, winning silver and gold medals at the Japanese high school championships in 2009. He chose to specialise in the latter event from mid-2009 onwards. Abe ran a personal best of 49.46 seconds to claim the silver medal at the 2010 World Junior Championships in Athletics, finishing closely behind the strong favourite Jehue Gordon. He also ran with the Japanese 4×400 metres relay team, helping them to fifth place. His hurdles time made him the third best Asian in the event that year, after compatriots Kenji Narisako and Takayuki Koike.

Abe made his second ever sub-50-second clocking at the 2011 Japanese Athletics Championships, where he took third with a time of 49.81 seconds. He was selected to represent Japan at the 2011 Asian Athletics Championships in Kobe and he went away with his first regional title, ending the race with a time of 49.64 seconds to win the gold medal.

He competed at the 2020 Summer Olympics.

International competition

National titles
Japanese Championships
400 m hurdles: 2017, 2019, 2020

References

External links
 
 Takatoshi Abe at Yamada Denki Athletics Club 
 

1991 births
Living people
Japanese male hurdlers
Sportspeople from Okayama Prefecture
Asian Games bronze medalists for Japan
Asian Games medalists in athletics (track and field)
Athletes (track and field) at the 2018 Asian Games
Medalists at the 2018 Asian Games
Universiade silver medalists for Japan
Universiade medalists in athletics (track and field)
Medalists at the 2011 Summer Universiade
World Athletics Championships athletes for Japan
Japan Championships in Athletics winners
Olympic athletes of Japan
Athletes (track and field) at the 2020 Summer Olympics
20th-century Japanese people
21st-century Japanese people